The Great Synagogue (Polish: Wielka Synagoga w Jaśle) was an Orthodox Jewish synagogue in Jasło, Poland. It was built in 1905, and was destroyed by the German Army during World War II (1939). After the war a restaurant was built on the site.

The Forest Hill Jewish Centre will be rebuilt with the replica façade of the Jasło Synagogue on its new building on Spadina Road in Toronto, Canada.

References

  The Jewish Community in Old Jasło from ShtetLinks

Former synagogues in Poland
Jasło County
Synagogues in Poland destroyed by Nazi Germany
Buildings and structures in Podkarpackie Voivodeship
Synagogues completed in 1905
1905 establishments in Poland
Orthodox synagogues in Poland
20th-century religious buildings and structures in Poland